Raymond Fau (16 August 1936 – 27 December 2021) was a French singer-songwriter and photographer. He primarily sang liturgical music.

Life and career
Fau was born in Graulhet on 16 August 1936. At the age of 18, Fau briefly lived in Ubangi-Shari, which became a turning point in his life.

For thirty years, Fau composed many sung prayers and liturgical songs, such as Tu es là, au cœur de nos vies. Later in his life, he turned to photography, specializing in portraits. His images illustrated two works by Jean Debruynne. On 15 June 1996, Fau retired from singing. He continued practicing photography in his hometown of Graulhet.

Fau died on 27 December 2021, at the age of 85.

Discography
La vie c’est comme ça
Douze petits Noëls
Combien de temps (1970)
Je mets ma main dans ta main (1972)
Tu es là au cœur de nos vies (1973)
25 ans de prières chantées (1989)
Chanter Marie (1992)
Huit messes simples (1994)
À Dieu (1996)

Photographic works
Les Voyageurs de Dieu (1987)
Rencontres et Regards (1991)

Exhibitions
Moines et Moinillons du Myanmar at the Tour des Rondes (Lavaur, 2011)
Printemps de Photographes, (Graulhet, 2016)

References

External links
 

1936 births
2021 deaths
French singer-songwriters
French photographers
People from Tarn (department)